Jänken is a 1970 Swedish drama film directed by Lars Lennart Forsberg. Anita Ekström won the award for Best Actress at the 7th Guldbagge Awards.

Cast
 Anita Ekström as Inger
 Lars Green as Maskot
 Mona Dan-Bergman as Morsan
 Inger Ekström as Anita
 Gunnar Ossiander
 Louise Hedberg as Sylvia, Inger's sister
 Kay Sandberg as Maskot's friend
 Gunnar Carlsson as Maskot's friend
 May Dawson as Tyra
 Benny Hansson as Johnny
 Anna-Lisa Holstensson as Mrs. Larsson
 Åje Eriksson as Baker
 Tommy Sernling as Peter

References

External links
 
 

1970 films
1970 drama films
Swedish drama films
1970s Swedish-language films
Swedish black-and-white films
1970s Swedish films